is a Japanese judoka. His wife, Chiyori is bronze medalist of Olympic Games in 1992.

Masuchi is from Tsu, Mie. He began judo at the age of a 10 and after graduation from Tsukuba University, He belonged to Marunaka and Nippon Steel.

He became Asian champion of openweight category in 1994, 1997. He also participated All-Japan Judo Championships 13 times, and the record is the most in history.

As of 2009, Masuchi coaches judo at his alma mater, Tsukuba University, where he previously studied as an undergraduate.

References

Japanese male judoka
People from Mie Prefecture
1970 births
Living people
Asian Games medalists in judo
Judoka at the 1994 Asian Games
Asian Games gold medalists for Japan
Medalists at the 1994 Asian Games
Universiade medalists in judo
Universiade gold medalists for Japan
Medalists at the 1995 Summer Universiade
20th-century Japanese people